Aleksander Berezkin is a Russian intersex man, asylum seeker and intersex human rights activist. He is a founder of the first Russian intersex human rights organisation ARSI (“Association of the Russian-Speaking Intersex”). He has also started an organization, Intersex Immigrants Network, to support the human and civil rights of immigrants to the US, and those at risk of emigration.

Early life 

Berezkin was born in Novokuznetsk, Russia. He was diagnosed with Klinefelter syndrome at the age of 17, after learning about his diagnosis directly from his physician. He openly speaks about living with Klinefelter syndrome.

He has graduated with a BA in Sociology from Kemerovo State University and an MA in Sociology from Far Eastern State Technical University.

Berezkin has stated that his doctor told him he will never find someone else with his intersex variation, that he  should keep it a secret, and never talk about his identity with anyone.

Activism 
Berezkin started his advocacy in 2013, following a talk with Hida Viloria, working on intersex and LGBTI issues, organising educational events for the LGBT community in Vladivostok. In 2014 Berezkin had to leave Russia as a result of a homophobic campaign against him. He sought political asylum in the United States on the basis that he was an LBGTQI activist. He was granted asylum in 2017.

In August 2013 he created Facebook group called “Association of the Russian-Speaking Intersex” (ARSI) for intersex people and allies, which further have become the first Russian intersex human rights organisation. In the following years he acted as a Russian-Speaking Intersex consultant for the United Nations Free & Equal program.

Berezkin speaks on health and civil rights issues.

References 

Intersex rights in Russia
Intersex men
Intersex rights activists
People from Novokuznetsk
Kemerovo State University alumni
Far Eastern State Technical University alumni
1984 births
Living people